Lina Kiriliuk (born 6 July 1996) is a Lithuanian long-distance runner. She competed in the women's half marathon at the 2020 World Athletics Half Marathon Championships held in Gdynia, Poland.

In 2019, she competed in the women's half marathon at the Summer Universiade held in Naples, Italy. She finished in 18th place. In 2020, she won the bronze medal in the women's 5000 metres event at the Lithuanian Athletics Championships held in Palanga, Lithuania.

References

External links 
 

Living people
1996 births
Place of birth missing (living people)
Lithuanian female long-distance runners
Lithuanian female marathon runners
Competitors at the 2019 Summer Universiade